Robley Wilson (June 15, 1930 – August 7, 2018) was an American poet, writer, and editor. Educated at Bowdoin College, B.A., 1957; Indiana University, graduate study, 1960; University of Iowa, M.F.A., 1968. Married Charlotte Lehon, August 20, 1955 (divorced, 1990); married fiction writer Susan Hubbard in 1995; two sons: (first marriage) Stephen, Philip, two stepdaughters: Kate and Clare, and two grandchildren, Sam and Kate.

Life
Wilson taught creative writing at the University of Northern Iowa from 1964 to 1996, and from 1969 to 2000 was editor of the North American Review, a university-owned magazine which twice won the National Magazine Award for Fiction administered by the American Society of Magazine Editors. The magazine was a finalist in the fiction category six times.

Wilson had been visiting writer at the University of Iowa Writers Workshop, Beloit College, Northwestern University, Pitzer College, and the University of Central Florida.

A short film, Favorites, adapted from Wilson's short story, produced and directed by Tracy Facelli, premiered at the 2017 Film Prize: Memphis; it features Jeff Boyet and Nettie Kraft in the lead roles. Another short film, based on his story "Terrible Kisses". features Saffron Burrows and Jack Davenport; it was screened in 2004 at the Rushes Short Film Festival in London's Soho district, has been seen on Sky television in the U.K., and is still available on YouTube. Wilson's screenplay Paradise was a semi-finalist in the 2005 Screenwriting Expo competition.

Co-edited with Susan Hubbard, ("The Society of S" [2007], "The Year of Disappearances" [2008]), and "The Season of Risks" [2010]), 100% Pure Florida Fiction, an anthology of Florida short stories written since 1985 (University Press of Florida, 2000).

Co-founded literary consultancy, Blue Garage, with Susan Hubbard .

Awards
 1986 Agnes Lynch Starrett Poetry Prize
 1983–84 Guggenheim Fellow in fiction.
 1982 Drue Heinz Literature Prize
 1995 Nicholl Fellow in Screenwriting
1991 Society of Midland Authors Award for Poetry
1979 Editor's Fellowship (Coordinating Council of Literary Magazines)

Works

Poetry collections

Novels

Stories

Living Alone [stories]. Canton NY, Fiction International, 1978

Editor

Short fiction 

 Addison. ANTAEUS 24 Winter 1976 p 28-48. 
 Adieu, Marianne. SANTA MONICA REVIEW Fall 2018 (in press) 
 Africa. TRIQUARTERLY 66 Spring/S.ummer 1986 p. 65-83. in Gibbons, Reginald, and Susan Hahn, eds., Fiction of the Eighties: A decade of stories from TriQuarterly. Evanston IL, Northwestern University, 990. p 335-53.
 An Age of Beauty and Terror. SOUTHERN CALIFORNIA ANTHOLOGY Vol. XI p. 17-26. 
 Angels. ]BOULEVARD 4/5:201-18 Spring 1990. 
 Animals. THE LASCAUX REVIEW 2 June 2013 
 The Apple. CARLETON MISCELLANY 9:24-34 Winter 1968. In Minot, Stephen, and Wilson, Robley, Jr., Three Stances of Modern Fiction: A Critical Anthology of the Short Story. Cambridge MA, Winthrop Publishers, Inc., 1972. p. 182-91.
 Appliances. NIMROD 37:132-5 Fall/Winter 1993. AMERICA WEST AIRLINES MAGAZINE 12:106, 108, 110, 112 November 1997. 
 Artists and Their Models. NORTHERN OHIO LIVE 1:22-5 Aug. 24-Sept. 6, 1981.
 Banners. \SOUTHERN CALIFORNIA ANTHOLOGY Vol. XIII (1996) p. 73-86. 
 Barber. PEN Syndicated Fiction Project, 1985–86. NEWSDAY November 1985 (Published but not seen) THE VILLAGE ADVOCATE (Chapel Hill, NC) 7:7-8 February 16, 1986. 
 Bears. WIGLEAF (Online: wigleaf.com), May 4, 2010. 
 A Berchtesgaden Night. PIECES 1 July 1979 p. 8. 
 Bloodweed (excerpt) THE LITERARIAN September 2013 California. THE IOWA REVIEW 25:23-46 Fall 1995. 
 Catch and Release. SAW PALM 6:155-168 Spring 2012. 
 Cat Watching [Lessons in Cats]. NIMROD 17:68-75 Fall/Winter 1972. In Fireman, Judy, ed., Cat Catalog: The Ultimate Cat Book. New York, NY, Workman Publishing Company, 1976. p 67-8. [excerpt] In Rogak, Linda A., The Quotable Cat. Chicago IL, Contemporary Books, 1992. p 108. [excerpt] 
 Cats. NEW YORKER 60:24-8 January 28, 1985. VIVA (Amsterdam) 1990 No. 5. (Tr. by Mariella Snel) In Rosen, Michael J., ed., The Company of Cats. New York, NY, Doubleday, 1992. p 18-28.
 Celebrity. TWILIGHT ZONE MAGAZINE 6:42-44 April 1986. 
 Children. MISSISSIPPI REVIEW 9:66 Winter-Spring 1980. 
 The Climate in Florida. [See "Packing"] 
 Columbus. In Van Cleve, Ryan G., and Virgil Suarez, eds., Micro: An Anthology of Really Short Stories, Lake View, NY, White Pine Press, 2001. (In press) 
 Crooked. SANTA MONICA REVIEW 23:1 Spring 2011 p. 153-178. 
 Crossings. MISSISSIPPI REVIEW 9:70 Winter-Spring 1980. 
 The Dark. HOPKINS REVIEW4:309-328 Summer 2011. 
 A Day of Splendid Omens. TRIQUARTERLY 103 Fall 1998 p. 104-119. 
 The Decline of the West. PEN Syndicated Fiction Project, 1985. NORTHWEST MAGAZINE (The Sunday Oregonian) 20:20-1 January 27, 1985. THIS WORLD (San Francisco Sunday Examiner and Chronicle, January 27, 1985 p 15-16. ENQUIRER MAGAZINE (Cincinnati Sunday Enquirer) April 21, 1985 p. 10-12.
 Despair. In Anderson, Donald, ed., Aftermath: A Post-Vietnam Fiction Reader. New York NY, Henry Holt & Co., 1995. p 171-7. 
 The Demonstration. CARLETON MISCELLANY 11:40-54 Summer 1970.
 Dorothy & Her Friends. SANTA MONICA REVIE 2:79-145 Spring 1990.
 The Eventual Nuclear Destruction of Cheyenne, Wyoming. ATLANTIC 251:72-5 May 1983.
 Fashion. MISSISSIPPI REVIEW 9:68 Winter-Spring 1980. In Robinson, S. D., ed., Fast Forward: Destinations. Scarborough, Ontario, Canada, Prentice-Hall Canada, 1990. p136-7.
 Fathers. PLOUGHSHARES 9/4 p 131-136. In Henry, DeWitt, ed., The Ploughshares Reader: New Fiction for the Eighties. Yonkers NY, The Pushcart Press, 1985. p334-9. 
 Favorites. In Woodman, Allen, ed., Stories about How Things Fall Apart and What's Left When They Do. Tallahassee FL, Word Beat Press, 1985. p27-32. [Preferinte]. ORIZONT [Bucharest) March 6, 1986 p8.  (Translated into Romanian by Marcel Pop-Cornis). [As "A Sweet Memory"]. REDBOOK 174:172,174 March 1990. THE MATILDA ZIEGLER MAGAZINE FOR THE BLIND (In press). In Hemley, Robin, Turning Life into Fiction. Cincinnati, Ohio, Story Press, 1994. p 93-4 [Excerpt]
 A Fear of Children. ANTAEUS 38 Summer 1980 p73-86. Feature Presentations. SEWANEE REVIEW 96:389-406 Summer 1988.
 Flaggers. ISAAC ASIMOV'S SCIENCE FICTION MAGAZINE 11:104-11 June 1987. 
 Flies. STORY 38:54-61 Winter 1990. Forfeits. NEW WORLD WRITING , 1/2/2016. 
 Happy Marriages Are All Alike. FICTION INTERNATIONAL 1:49-53 Fall 1973.
 Hard Times. EPOCH 44:180-194 1995 Series. In So the Story Goes: Twenty-Five Years of the Johns Hopkins Short Fiction Series. Baltimore MD, Johns Hopkins University Press, 2005.p278-94. 
 His Cheatin' Heart [See also "Pillow Talk"]. REDBOOK 163:28,31 August 1984. WOMEN'S MAGAZINE [South Africa] (Not seen) 
 The Hundred Steps. PIECES 1 July 1979 p 16. Iris. INDIANA REVIEW 8:7-13 Spring 1985. 
 Land Fishers. ] ANTAEUS 48 Winter 1983 p 183-199. In Murphy, George, Jr., ed., The Editors' Choice: New American Stories, Volume 1. New York NY, Bantam Books, Inc., 1985. p267-85. 
 Lessons in Cats. [See "Cat Watching"] 
 Likeness. IOWA CITY MAGAZINE June/July 1991 p 53-5. VIVA [Amsterdam] (In press) (Translated into Dutch by Mariella Snel.)
 Links. THE HOPKINS REVIEW n.s. 5:518-30 Fall 2012. Living Alone. In Oates, Joyce Carol, ed., Best American Short Stories of 1979. Boston MA, Houghton Mifflin Company, 1979. p167-71. In Nobumori, Hiromitsu, ed., The Best American Short Stories. Tokyo, Japan, The Hokuseido Press, 1983. p 89-97. (Selected from J. C. Oates: The Best American Short Stories 1979, and annotated [in Japanese] by the editor).
 The Mall. In Swartwood, Robert, ed., Hint Fiction: An Anthology of Stories in 25 Words or Fewer. New York NY, W.W.Norton, 2011. p 83. 
 Menagerie. In Rubin, Gay, ed., Michigan Hot Apples 2. Bloomfield Hills MI, Hot Apples Press, 1973. p 59-64.
 Mice. PRAIRIE SCHOONER  69:116-24 Winter 1995. 
 Mothers. MINNESOTA REVIEW NS 16 Spring 1981 p151. 
 Nam. GEORGIA REVIEW   38:369-75 Summer 1984. 
 One of Our Boys. CRESSET 25:12-13 December 1961. 
 On the Island. METAMORPHOSIS 1961 1:19-25 Spring 1961. In McNair, Wesley, ed. The Quotable Moose: A Contemporary Maine Reader Hanover NH, University Press of New England, 1994. p196-210.
 Others. CARLETON MISCELLANY 6:4-29 Fall 1965. In Merriam, Sharan B., ed., Themes of Adulthood through Literature. New York NY, Teachers College Press Columbia University, 1983. p30-51. 
 Packing. SEWANEE REVIEW CXIII:501-17 Fall 2005. 
 Parts Runner. SANTA MONICA REVIEW 12:116-27 Spring 2000. 
 Payment in Kind.  SEWANEE REVIEW  93:20-38  Winter 1985.In Norris, Gloria, ed., New American Short Stories: The Writers Select Their Own Favorites. New York NY, New American Library, 1987. p 311-331. 
 The Perfect Wife [De Perfecte Vrouw].  VIVA [Amsterdam] p 52-4 #24: 7 June-14 	June, 1991. (Translated into Dutch by Mariella Snel.) 
 Period Piece. THE HOPKINS REVIEW  2:508-16  Fall 2009. 
 Petra. SEWANEE REVIEW  94:45-57  Winter 1986. 
 The Phoenix Agent. LOST MAGAZINE (www.LOSTmag.com)  November 2006. 
 Pillow Talk [See also "His Cheatin' Heart"].  WOMAN [Great Britain] July 6, 1985 p 21.
 Praises. THE LAUREL REVIEW  22:77-107  Winter 1988. 
 Quarters. AETHLON: The Journal of Sport Literature  XXVII:2 Spring/Summer 2010. p 49-55. 
 Quills. PRAIRIE SCHOONER  66:25-34  Summer 1992. In Rosen, Michael J., ed., The Company of Animals. New York NY,	Doubleday. 1993. p 198-209.
 Remembered Names. THE GETTYSBURG REVIEW   4:593-608 Winter 1997.
 Salt & Pepper. In Stiller's Pond: New Fiction from the Upper Midwest. Second edition. St. Paul MN, New Rivers Press. 1991. p 456-7.
 Saying Goodbye to the President.  ESQUIRE  81:124, 138, 140 February 1974. In Bellamy, Joe David, ed., SuperFiction, or The American Story Transformed: An Anthology. New York NY, Vintage Books, 1975.  p 187-94. In Lish, Gordon, ed., All Our Secrets Are the Same. New York, N.Y., W. W. Norton & Company, 1976. p 1-2.
 The Seasonal: Pamela.  SEATTLE REVIEW  9:70-8  Spring 1986.
 Silent Partners.  THE CREAM CITY REVIEW  13:182-7 Winter 1989. VIVA (Amsterdam) 1990 No. 3 (Tr. by Mariella Snel). In McNally, John, ed., High Infidelity. New York, NY, William Morrow & Company, 1997.  p 259-65. In McNally, John, ed., High Infidelity.  New York, NY, Quill Edition, William Morrow & Company, 1998. p 259-65.
 A Simple Elegy for Speaking and Touching.  POET & CRITIC 18:44-8 Fall 1986. 
 Sisters. PEN Syndicated Fiction Project, 1988. VILLAGE ADVOCATE (Chapel Hill, NC) 2:3-4 May 29, 1988. COSMOPOLITAN (England) (Not seen) (Søstre]. DET NYE (Norway) March 1990 p 76-8.
 Sons. THE AMERICAN VOICE 8  Fall 1987  p30-42. DOWN EAST  36:120, 82-91  January 1990.
 The States. PRAIRIE SCHOONER  61:93-103  Fall 1987.
 A Stay at the Ocean.  CARLETON MISCELLANY  10:39-54  Summer 1969. In Stadler, John, ed., Eco-Fiction.  New York NY, Washington Square Press, 1971.  p85-99. Az oceanon].  In Peter, Kuczka, ed., Galaktika 30. Budapest, Hungary, Kozmosz Konyvek szerkesztosege, 1978. p4-14.  (Translated into Hungarian by F. Nagy Piroska) In Fischer, Jeff, and Alison Daley Stevenson, eds., Maine Speaks: An Anthology of Maine Literature. Brunswick ME, Maine Writers and Publishers Alliance, 1989. p250-261. In Thoughtful Reading. Perfection Form Co. 1989.
 Still Life. NEW WORLD WRITING , 1/2/2016.
 A Story with Sex and Violence.  MINNESOTA REVIEW  NS 16  Spring 1981. p 150.
 A Sweet Memory. [See "Favorites"] The Tennis Lover.  [See "Quarters"] 
 Terrible Kisses. In Datlow, Ellen, and Terri Windling, eds., The Year's Best Fantasy and Horror: Third Annual Collection, New York NY, St. Martin's Press, 1990. p518-23. VIVA (Amsterdam)  1990  No. 7.  (Tr. Mariella Snel)
 Terrorism. NEW WORLD WRITING , 1/2/2016. 
 Thief. FICTION INTERNATIONAL  12(1980)  p34-6. In Shapard, Robert, and James Thomas, eds., Sudden Fiction.  Layton UT, Gibbs M. Smith, Inc., 1986. p168-70. In Odeldahl, Lena, and Lisa Washburn, eds., Windows 2. Solna, Sweden, Almqvist & Wiksell Läromedel AB, 1989.  p15-18. In Moor, Rosemary, ed., Take It from Here.  London, England, Stanley Thornes (Publishers) Ltd, 1991. p51-7. In Yvinec, M. & Mrs., eds., Autonomy: Méthode d'anglais Terminales.  Paris, France, Hachette, 1992. Voice of America (Broadcast) [Indonesian] In Watkinson, Ellen, Lena Odeldahl & Lisa Washburn,  eds., Windows: English for Secondary Comprehensive School. Oslo, Norway, NKS-Forlaget, 1991. p127-30. In Expressions: Stories and Poems.  Chicago IL,  Contemporary Books, Inc. 1991.  p59-63. In Thompson, Keith, ed., To Be A Man.  Los Angeles CA, Jeremy P. Tarcher, Inc. 1992. In Adams, W. Royce, ed., Making the Grade: Student's  Reading Journal.  Boston MA, D.C.Heath & Co.  1992. p91-6. Ibid.  Second edition, 1997.  p92-7. In May, Charles, ed., Fiction's Many Worlds. Boston MA, D. C. Heath & Co.  1993.  p42-4.(excerpt)  In Another Page.  New York NY, Macmillan/McGraw-Hill (Glencoe Foundations for Success [software]), 1993. TRAIN OF THOUGHT (audio magazine) (In press) In Watkinson, Ellen, Lena Odeldahl & Lisa Washburn,  eds.,  Facts and Feelings.  Oslo, Norway, NKS-Forlaget, 1994.  p187-190. In Plötzliche Geschichten, Fischer Verlag [paper]   (published, not seen). (Dieb) In Johler, Jens, Das minimale Mißgeschick.  Köln,Germany, Verlag Kiepenheuer & Witsch, 1995. p34-7.  (Translated into German by Eike Schonfeld) In Kaleela, Maija-Leena, et al., eds. English Update. Espoo, Finland, Weilin & Gîîs, 1994. p100-101. (Dieb) FUNK UHR  No. 34 (26.Aug-1.Sept 1995) p87.  (Condensed, from the German translation by Eike Schonfeld) In Jacobi, Ilan. In Myszor, Frank, ed., Moments of Madness: 150 Years of Short Stories. Cambridge, U.K., Cambridge University Press, 1998. p115-18. In Grellet, Françoise, ed., 10 Short Stories. Hachette Livre, 2000. p78-86. In Wideman, John Edgar, ed. 20: The Best of the Drue Heinz Literature Prize. Pittsburgh, PA, University of Pittsburgh Press, 2001. p61-4.
 The Thousand-and-Second Night.  SOUTHERN CALIFORNIA ANTHOLOGY Vol. IV (1986)  p75-9. SOUTHERN CALIFORNIA ANTHOLOGY  Vol. X (1993) p150-4.
 The Three-Wish Story. BRIAR CLIFF REVIEW  5:4-6  Spring 1993.AMERICA WEST AIRLINES MAGAZINE   13:44-7  July 1998.
 The United States. FICTION INTERNATIONAL  6-7(1976)  p94-100. In Henderson, Bill, ed., The Pushcart Prize, III: Best of the Small Presses.  Yonkers, NY, The Pushcart  Press, 1978.  p197-207.  
 Visions.  COLORADO STATE REVIEW  5:14-36  Spring 1977. Visits.  NEW AMERICAN WRITING #6  Spring 1990.  p107-11. Wasps.  STORY QUARTERLY 9  Spring 1979  p22-8. In Cassill, R. V., ed., The Norton Anthology of Short Fiction, 3rd edition.  New York NY, W. W. Norton &  Co., 1986.  p1502-9.   [Wespen].  VIVA  (Amsterdam)  p52-3,55  #31: 26 July-2 August 1991. (Translated into Dutch by Mariella Snel) In Murabito, Stephen, ed. Connections, Contexts, and Possibilities. Englewood Cliffs, N.J., Prentice-Hall, Inc.  2000.  p213-19. In Minott, Katherine, et al., eds. Journeys Through Our World.  Boston, Mass. Pearson Custom Publishing, 2002. p188-95.
 Watching.  CARLETON MISCELLANY  11:2-8  Spring 1970.
 Wedding Day  THE LITERARIAN (http://centerforfiction.org/magazine/)  March 2011.
 Weights and Measures.  THE IOWA REVIEW  14:26-29  Winter 1984. PEN Syndicated Fiction Project, 1985–86.  THE VILLAGE ADVOCATE (Chapel Hill NC)  7:5 (2nd  section) January 19, 1986.  
 The Word.  THE SUN   February 2003   No. 326   p. 29. In Safransky, Sy, et al., The Mysterious Life of the Heart: Writing from The Sun About Passion, Longing, and Love, Chapel Hill, N.C., The Sun Publishing Co., 2009. p257-8.
 The World Still Melting.  NEW ENGLAND REVIEW  Fall 1992  14:240-51  Fall 1992.

References

External links
 Author's website
 An Interview with Robley Wilson, James Plath, IWU
 Reminiscences of Robley Wilson, Margaret Atwood, James Michael Dorsey, Gary Gildner, Perry Glasser, Margaret Morganroth Gullette, Leo J. Hertzel, Stephen Minot, Mary Peterson and Natalia Rachel Singer

1930 births
2018 deaths
American male poets
Agnes Lynch Starrett Poetry Prize winners
Beloit College faculty
University of Iowa faculty
Northwestern University faculty
Pitzer College faculty
University of Central Florida faculty
University of Northern Iowa faculty
People from Orlando, Florida
People from Cape Canaveral, Florida